Guli Surkh is a jamoat in north-western Tajikistan. It is part of the city of Istaravshan in Sughd Region. The jamoat has a total population of 42,582 (2015). It consists of 15 villages, including Guliston (the seat), Bobotago, Bodomzor (formerly: Tapkok) and Bogikalon.

References

Populated places in Sughd Region
Jamoats of Tajikistan